Trio 2000 + One is an album by the jazz drummer Paul Motian, released on the German Winter & Winter label. It features Motian with tenor saxophonist Chris Potter, pianist Masabumi Kikuchi, acoustic double bassist Larry Grenadier and bass guitarist Steve Swallow.

Track listing
All compositions by Paul Motian except as indicated
 "From Time to Time" - 4:50 
 "Dance" - 4:52 
 "One in Three" - 4:50 
 "Pas de Deux" (Chris Potter) - 7:03 
 "The Sunflower  5:21 
 "Bend over Backwards" (Steve Swallow) - 5:26 
 "Last Call" - 4:57 
 "Protoplasm" (Chris Potter) - 3:58 
Recorded at Avatar Studios in New York City on August 11 & 12, 1997

Personnel
Paul Motian - drums
Chris Potter - tenor saxophone
Masabumi Kikuchi - piano 
Steve Swallow - electric bass 
Larry Grenadier - double bass

References 

1998 albums
Paul Motian albums
Winter & Winter Records albums
Instrumental albums